CBAM-FM is a radio station broadcasting at 106.1 MHz from Moncton, New Brunswick, Canada, and is the local Radio One station of the Canadian Broadcasting Corporation. CBAM broadcasts with a power of 69,500 watts.

History
The Canadian Radio Broadcasting Commission owned and operated a station in Moncton under the call letters CRCA, which has previously been CNR Radio station CNRA. The station was closed down in on October 31, 1933 in anticipation of the construction of a more powerful transmitter in nearby Sackville that would cover the Maritime provinces. The CRBC was closed down in 1936 and replaced by the CBC, which inherited the project.

CBA 1070 AM
On April 8, 1939, the station signed on as CBA, a 50,000-watt clear-channel station at 1050 AM. It was the CBC's clear-channel outlet for the Maritime provinces, heard in the daytime over much of New Brunswick, Nova Scotia and Prince Edward Island, and at night audible over much of Eastern Canada and the Northeastern United States.

As a result of the North American Regional Broadcasting Agreement treaty, it moved to 1070 AM on March 29, 1941. The original city of licence was Sackville, the location of the transmitter site. The city of licence was later changed to Moncton in 1968 when the CBA transmitter, one 460-foot tower (140 metres), moved to Dover Road in the rural community of Fox Creek near Moncton. In the 1950s and 1960s, CBA's studios were located on St. George Street in Moncton. 

In September 1970, CBA and its French-language counterparts CBAF and CBAFT were given approval to relocate their studios and offices in a new complex at 250 Archibald Street (today known as University Avenue).

Moving to 106.1 FM
On January 8, 2007, the Canadian Radio-television and Telecommunications Commission (CRTC) approved the station's proposed move to 106.1 FM. Since Radio 2 had the local call sign of CBA-FM, CBA adopted the CBAM-FM call sign. The engineers were at the AM transmitter site on Dover Road in Dieppe to say goodbye to the old AM signal that signed off for good on the morning of April 7, 2008, shortly after the 8:30 CBC news. CBA was the last AM station in eastern New Brunswick, and the CBC wanted to stop a drop in market share.

CBAM was the former call sign of a defunct CBC low-power AM transmitter in Edmundston, which converted to FM as CBAN-FM, an FM rebroadcaster of CBZF-FM.

The original CBA transmitter site at the Tantramar Marshes near Sackville continued to broadcast Radio Canada International around the world on shortwave radio as well as relay broadcasts for several foreign shortwave broadcasters. For the purposes of CRTC licensing, the Sackville complex was designated under the call letters CKCX. The shortwave site discontinued broadcasts on December 1, 2012, after which its facilities were dismantled.

Local programming
CBAM currently produces a local news and current-affairs morning drive time program, Information Morning. It also carries midday, afternoon and weekend morning shows produced at CBHA-FM Halifax, Nova Scotia for Atlantic Canada. Every November, CBAM-FM hosts a local radiothon for the Dr. Georges-L. Dumont Hospital Foundation, with proceeds going to the Tree of Hope Campaign. This radiothon airs only on CBAM-FM.

Staff

Current staff
 Jonna Brewer - Host, Information Morning 
 Karin Reid LeBlanc - Executive Producer, Moncton
 Vanessa Blanch - Morning news editor, CBC News
 Shane Magee - reporter, CBC News
 Kate Letterick - reporter, CBC News

Former staff
Jo-Ann Roberts - co-host of Information Morning (currently at CBCV-FM Victoria)
Brent Taylor - co-host of Information Morning (now retired)
Rhonda Whittaker - host of Information Morning
Rhonda Day - co-host of Mainstreet (1985-1986)
Dave MacDonald - host, Information Morning

Rebroadcasters
CBAM-FM has the following rebroadcasters:

On October 25, 2013, the CRTC approved the CBC's application to relocate the facilities of CBAM-FM-1 Sackville to a new transmission site south of Ogden Mill; this was due to the closure of the CBC's shortwave facilities, where the local repeater was also located.

References

External links
CBC New Brunswick
 

Bam
Bam
Radio stations established in 1939
1939 establishments in New Brunswick